San Francisco is a corregimiento within Panama City, in Panamá District, Panamá Province, Panama with a population of 43,939 as of 2010. Its population as of 1990 was 34,262, and its population as of 2000 was 35,751.

Notable people 

 Noris Salazar Allen (born 1947), bryologist

References

Corregimientos of Panamá Province
Panamá District